is a multi-purpose stadium in the city of Tottori, Tottori Prefecture, Japan. 

It was the main stadium for the 40th National Athletic Meet held in 1985 and the 2004 88th Japan Athletics Championships. It is currently used mostly for football matches.  The stadium holds 30,000 people.

References

Gainare Tottori
Football venues in Japan
Athletics (track and field) venues in Japan
Multi-purpose stadiums in Japan
Sports venues in Tottori Prefecture
Tottori (city)
1966 establishments in Japan
Sports venues completed in 1966